Joseph Lewman Ware (June 5, 1913 – January 10, 1994), nicknamed "Showboat", was an American Negro league outfielder in the 1930s.

A native of Greenwood, South Carolina, Ware attended Westinghouse High School, and played college football at Howard University. He made his Negro leagues debut in 1932 for the Cleveland Stars and Pittsburgh Crawfords, and later played for the Newark Dodgers. Ware died in Pittsburgh, Pennsylvania in 1994 at age 80.

References

External links
 and Baseball-Reference Black Baseball stats and Seamheads

1913 births
1994 deaths
Newark Dodgers players
Pittsburgh Crawfords players
Baseball outfielders
Baseball players from South Carolina
People from Greenwood, South Carolina
Howard Bison football players
Akron Black Tyrites players
20th-century African-American sportspeople